This is a list of Roman nomina.  The nomen identified all free Roman citizens as members of individual gentes, originally families sharing a single nomen and claiming descent from a common ancestor.  Over centuries, a gens could expand from a single family to a large clan, potentially including hundreds or even thousands of members.  Some of these may have been the descendants of freedmen or persons who entered the gens through adoption, while in other cases, different families that had assumed the same nomen in the distant past became confused with one another, and came to be regarded as a single gens.

In the following list, "I" and "J" are treated as separate letters, as are "U" and "V".  The letter "K" was rare in Latin, and the few nomina occasionally spelled with this letter were usually spelled with "C".  No Roman gentes began with "X", and the letters "Y" and "Z" occurred only in names borrowed from Greek.  The letter "W" did not exist in Classical Latin.  Nomina are given in the masculine form—the form borne by all male members of a gens.  The gentes themselves were grammatically feminine.  Those nomina representing gentes for which separate articles exist are linked to those articles; those belonging to only one or two individuals, or known from only a few inscriptions, are not usually linked, but may be cited to the inscriptions in which they are attested.

A

 Abronius
 Abudius
 Aburius
 Accius
 Accoleius
 Acerronius
 Acilius
 Aconius
 Actorius
 Acutius
 Adginnius
 Aebutius
 Aedinius
 Aelius
 Aemilius
 Aerelius
 Afinius
 Afranius
 Agnanius
 Agorius
 Albanius
 Albatius
 Albinius
 Albius
 Albinovanus
 Albucius
 Alburius
 Alfenus
 Alfius
 Allectius
 Allienus
 Amafinius
 Amatius
 Amblasius
 Ambrosius
 Ampius
 Amplas
 Ampudius
 Amusanus
 Ancharius
 Anicius
 Anisinus
 Anisius
 Annaeus
 Anneius
 Annius
 Anquirinnius
 Antistius
 Antius
 Antonius
 Apisius
 Aponius
 Appianius
 Appius
 Appuleius
 Apronius
 Apustius
 Aquillius
 Aquinius
 Arellius
 Arennius
 Arminius
 Arpineius
 Arrecinus
 Arrius
 Arruntius
 Arsinius
 Articuleius
 Artorius
 Asconius
 Asellius
 Asinius
 Asvillius
 Ateius
 Aternius
 Ateronius
 Atius
 Atilius
 Atinius
 Atrius
 Attius
 Atzicius
 Auconius
 Auctorius
 Audasius
 Aufeius
 Aufidius
 Aulius
 Aurelius
 Aurius
 Aurunculeius
 Ausonius
 Autrodius
 Autronius
 Avianus
 Avidius
 Avienus
 Avilius
 Avius
 Axius

B

 Babrius
 Baebius
 Balonius
 Balventius
 Bantius
 Barbatius
 Barrius
 Barsius
 Bavius
 Bellicius
 Bellienus
 Bellius
 Betilienus
 Betitius
 Betucius
 Betuus
 Bicleius
 Blandius
 Blossius
 Boionius
 Bruttius
 Bucculeius
 Burbuleius
 Burrienus
 Butronius

C

 Caecilius
 Caecina
 Caecius
 Caedicius
 Caelius
 Caeparius
 Caepasius
 Caerellius
 Caesellius
 Caesennius
 Caesetius
 Caesius
 Caesonius
 Caesulenus
 Caetronius
 Calavius
 Calesterna
 Calidius
 Calpurnius
 Calumeius
 Calvenus
 Calventius
 Calvisius
 Camaronius
 Campatius
 Canidius
 Caninius
 Canius
 Cantilius
 Cantius
 Canuleius
 Canutius
 Carfulenus
 Carisius
 Caristanius
 Caristicus
 Carius
 Carpinatius
 Carrinas
 Carsicius
 Carteius
 Carvilius
 Casperius
 Cassius
 Castricius
 Castrinius
 Catabronius
 Catienus
 Catilius
 Catius
 Cavinnius
 Ceionius
 Centenius
 Ceppuleius
 Cerenius
 Cervilius
 Cervonius
 Cestius
 Cicereius
 Cilnius
 Cincius
 Cispius
 Classidius
 Claudius
 Cloelius
 Cluentius
 Clutorius
 Cluvius
 Cocceius
 Coelius
 Cominius
 Communius
 Concessius
 Condetius
 Consentius
 Considius
 Consius
 Coponius
 Cordius
 Corfidius
 Cornelius
 Cornificius
 Coruncanius
 Cosconius
 Cossinius
 Cossutius
 Cotius
 Cottius
 Crassicius
 Crastinus
 Cremutius
 Crepereius
 Critonius
 Cupiennius
 Curiatius
 Curius
 Curtilius
 Curtius
 Cusinius
 Cuspius

D

 Decidius
 Decimius
 Decitius
 Decius
 Decumenus
 Dellius
 Dercullius
 Desticius
 Dexius
 Didius
 Digitius
 Dillius
 Distubuanus
 Domitius
 Dubius
 Duccius
 Duilius
 Duratenus
 Durmius
 Duronius

E

 Ebetius
 Eggius
 Egilius
 Egnatius
 Egnatuleius
 Egrilius
 Elvius
 Ennius
 Epidius
 Eppius
 Equitius
 Eranius
 Erucius
 Evasius

F

 Fabius
 Fabricius
 Fadenus
 Fadius
 Faenius
 Falcidius
 Falerius
 Faminius
 Fannius
 Farsuleius
 Faucius
 Favonius
 Festinius
 Fidiculanius
 Firmius
 Flaminius
 Flanus
 Flavinius
 Flavius
 Flavoleius
 Flavonius
 Floridius
 Florius
 Floronius
 Fonteius
 Foslius
 Fufetius
 Fuficius
 Fufidius
 Fufius
 Fulcinius
 Fulginas
 Fulvius
 Fundanius
 Furius
 Furnius

G

 Gabinius
 Gagilius
 Galerius
 Gallius
 Gargonius
 Gavius
 Geganius
 Gellius
 Geminius
 Genucius
 Gessius
 Glicius
 Granius
 Gratidius
 Gratius

H

 Haterius
 Hedusius
 Heius
 Helvidius
 Helvius
 Herennius
 Herennuleius
 Herminius
 Hirrius
 Hirtius
 Hirtuleius
 Hisseius
 Horatius
 Hordeonius
 Hortensius
 Hosidius
 Hostilius
 Hostius
 Humidius

I

 Iallius
 Iasidius
 Iccius
 Icilius
 Ignius
 Ingenius
 Insteius
 Istacidius
 Iteius
 Iturius

J

 Janius
 Javolenus
 Jucundius
 Julius
 Juncius
 Junius
 Justinius
 Juventius

L

 Laberius
 Labienus
 Lacerius
 Laecanius
 Laelius
 Laenius
 Laetilius
 Laetorius
 Lafrenius
 Lamponius
 Laronius
 Lartius
 Latinius
 Lavinius
 Lemonius
 Lentidius
 Lepanius
 Lepidius
 Libellius
 Libertius
 Liburnius
 Licinius
 Ligarius
 Limisius
 Litrius
 Livinius
 Livius
 Lollius
 Longinius
 Loreius
 Lucceius
 Lucienus
 Lucilius
 Lucius
 Lucretius
 Lurius
 Luscidius
 Luscius
 Lusius
 Lutatius

M

 Maccius
 Maccienus
 Macrinius
 Macrobius
 Maecenas
 Maecilius
 Maecius
 Maelius
 Maenas
 Maenius
 Maevius
 Magius
 Mallius
 Mamercius
 Mamilius
 Manilius
 Manlius
 Mannaius
 Marcius
 Marius
 Martinius
 Matienus
 Matinius
 Matius
 Matrinius
 Mattavius
 Matuius
 Maximius
 Memmius
 Menenius
 Menius
 Mercatorius
 Mescinius
 Messienus
 Messius
 Mestrius
 Metilius
 Mettius
 Milonius
 Mimesius
 Minatius
 Minicius
 Minidius
 Minius
 Minucius
 Moderatius
 Modius
 Mucimeius
 Mucius
 Multillius
 Mummius
 Munatius
 Munius
 Murrius
 Mussidius
 Mustius
 Mutilius
 Mutius

N

 Naevius
 Nasennius
 Nasidienus
 Nasidius
 Nautius
 Neratius
 Nercius
 Nerfinius
 Nerius
 Nessinius
 Nesulna
 Nigidius
 Nimmius
 Ninnius
 Nipius
 Nonius
 Norbanus
 Novellius
 Novercinius
 Novius
 Numerius
 Numicius
 Numisius
 Numitorius
 Nummius
 Numoleius
 Numonius
 Nunnuleius
 Nymphidius

O

 Obellius
 Obultronius
 Occius
 Oclatinius
 Oclatius
 Ocratius
 Octavenus
 Octavius
 Ofanius
 Ofatulenus
 Ofilius
 Ogulnius
 Ollius
 Opellius
 Opetreius
 Opimius
 Opisius
 Opiternius
 Oppidius
 Oppius
 Opsidius
 Opsilius
 Opsius
 Oranius
 Orbicius
 Orbilius
 Orbius
 Orchius
 Orcivius
 Orfidius
 Orfius
 Orosius
 Oscius
 Ostorius
 Otacilius
 Ovidius
 Ovinius

P

 Paccius
 Paciaecus
 Pacidius
 Pacilius
 Paconius
 Pactumeius
 Pacuvius
 Paldius
 Palfurius
 Palpellius
 Pantuleius
 Papinius
 Papirius
 Papius
 Pascellius
 Pasidienus
 Pasidius
 Passienus
 Patulcius
 Pedanius
 Pedius
 Peducaeus
 Peltrasius
 Percennius
 Perperna
 Persius
 Pescennius
 Petillius
 Petreius
 Petronius
 Petrosidius
 Pilius
 Pinarius
 Pinnius
 Pisentius
 Pitisedius
 Placidius
 Plaetorius
 Plaguleius
 Plancius
 Plarius
 Plautius
 Pleminius
 Plinius
 Ploticius
 Pluticius
 Poetelius
 Pollius
 Pompeius
 Pompilius
 Pomponius
 Pomptinus
 Pompuledius
 Pontidius
 Pontificius
 Pontilienus
 Pontilius
 Pontius
 Popaedius
 Popidius
 Poppaeus
 Porcius
 Porsina
 Postumius
 Postumulenus
 Potitius
 Praecilius
 Praeconius
 Prastinius
 Precius
 Priscius
 Procilius
 Proculeius
 Propertius
 Publicius
 Puccasius
 Publilius
 Pupius
 Pusonius

Q

 Quartinius
 Quartius
 Queresius
 Quinctilius
 Quinctius
 Quinquaius
 Quirinius

R

 Rabirius
 Rabonius
 Rabuleius
 Racectius
 Racilius
 Raecius
 Ragonius
 Rammius
 Ranius
 Rasinius
 Reconius
 Reginius
 Remmius
 Rennius
 Resius
 Ricinius
 Romanius
 Romilius
 Roscius
 Rubellius
 Rubrenus
 Rubrius
 Rufinius
 Rufius
 Rufrius
 Rullius
 Rupilius
 Rusonius
 Rusticelius
 Rustius
 Rutilius

S

 Sabellius
 Sabidius
 Sabinius
 Sabucius
 Saenius
 Saevonius
 Safinius
 Sagarius
 Salienus
 Sallustius
 Salonius
 Saltius
 Saltorius
 Salvidienus
 Salvidius
 Salvius
 Salvienus
 Samacius
 Samientus
 Sammius
 Sanquinius
 Sariolenus
 Sarius
 Sarrenius
 Satellius
 Satrienus
 Satrius
 Sattius
 Saturius
 Saturninius
 Saufeius
 Scaevilius
 Scaevinius
 Scaevius
 Scalacius
 Scandilius
 Scantinius
 Scantius
 Scaptius
 Scatidius
 Scetanus
 Scoedius
 Scribonius
 Scuilius
 Scutarius
 Seccius
 Secundinius
 Secundius
 Sedatius
 Segulius
 Seius
 Selicius
 Sellius
 Sempronius
 Sennius
 Sentius
 Seppienus
 Seppius
 Septicius
 Septimius
 Septimuleius
 Septueius
 Sepullius
 Sepunius
 Sergius
 Serius
 Sertorius
 Servaeus
 Servenius
 Servilius
 Servius
 Sestius
 Severius
 Sextilius
 Sextius
 Sibidienus
 Sicinius
 Silicius
 Silius
 Silvius
 Simplicius
 Simplicinius
 Sinicius
 Sinnius
 Sinuleius
 Sisenna
 Sittius
 Socellius
 Sollius
 Sornatius
 Sosius
 Sotidius
 Spedioleius
 Spedius
 Spellius
 Splattius
 Spurilius
 Spurinna
 Spurius
 Staberius
 Staius
 Stallius
 Statilius
 Statinius
 Statioleius
 Statius
 Statorius
 Statrius
 Steius
 Stellius
 Stenius
 Stertinius
 Stlabillenus
 Stlaccius
 Stlammius
 Stlarius
 Strabonius
 Subrius
 Successius
 Suedius
 Suellius
 Suetonius
 Suettius
 Suilius or Suillius
 Sulpicius
 Summianius
 Surdinius

T

 Tadius
 Talepius
 Talius
 Tampius
 Tanicius
 Tannonius
 Tanusius
 Tapsenna
 Tariolenus
 Taronius
 Tarpeius
 Tarquinius
 Tarquitius
 Tarrutenius
 Tarutius
 Tatius
 Tattius
 Taurius
 Tebanus
 Tecusenus
 Tedisenus
 Teditius
 Tedius
 Teiustius
 Terefrius
 Terrasidius
 Terentilius
 Terentius
 Tertinius
 Tertius
 Tetricius
 Tetrinius
 Tettidius
 Tettienus
 Tettius
 Thoranius
 Thorius
 Tiburtius
 Ticinius
 Tifernius
 Tigellius
 Tigidius
 Tilioficiosus
 Tillius
 Tineius
 Titanius
 Titedius
 Titinius
 Titioleius
 Titius
 Tittidienus
 Tittienus
 Tittius
 Titucius
 Tituculenus
 Titulenus
 Titurius
 Titurnius
 Togonius
 Traius
 Tranquillius
 Traulus
 Trausius
 Travinius
 Travius
 Trebanius
 Trebatius
 Trebellienus
 Trebellius
 Trebicius
 Trebius
 Trebulanus
 Trebonius
 Tremellius
 Triarius
 Triccius
 Trisimpedius
 Tritius
 Truttedius
 Tuccius
 Tudicius
 Tullius
 Turallasius
 Turciacus
 Turcilius
 Turbonius
 Turcius
 Turionius
 Turius
 Turpilius
 Turranius
 Turselius
 Tursidius
 Turullius
 Tuscenius
 Tuscilius
 Tussanius
 Tussidius
 Tuticanus
 Tuticius
 Tutilius
 Tutinius
 Tutius
 Tutorius

U

 Ulentinius
 Ulpius
 Umberius
 Umbilius
 Umbirius
 Umboleius
 Umbonius
 Umbrenus
 Umbricius
 Umbrius
 Umbrilius
 Umerius
 Ummidius
 Urbanius
 Urbicius
 Urbinius
 Urgulanius
 Ursius
 Urseius
 Urvinius
 Ussinus
 Utilius

V

 Valerius
 Varenus
 Varinius
 Varisidius
 Varius
 Vatinius
 Vecilius
 Vedius
 Vedodius
 Vegetius
 Velanius
 Velius
 Velleius
 Vemnasius
 Ventidius
 Venuleius
 Vequasius
 Veranius
 Verbisius
 Verecundius
 Vergilius
 Verginius
 Verres
 Verrius
 Vesiculanus
 Vesnius
 Vesonius
 Vespasius
 Vestius
 Vestorius
 Vestricius
 Vestrius
 Vetilius
 Vettius
 Veturius
 Vibenius
 Vibidius
 Vibius
 Vibulliacus
 Vibullius
 Vicirius
 Victorinius
 Victorius
 Victricius
 Viducius
 Vigilius
 Villius
 Vinicius
 Vinius
 Vipsanius
 Vipstanus
 Viridius
 Virius
 Visellius
 Vistilius
 Vitellius
 Vitedius
 Vitrasius
 Vitruvius
 Vivanius
 Voconius
 Volcacius
 Volnius
 Volscius
 Volturcius
 Volumnius
 Volusenna
 Volusenus
 Volusius
 Vorenius
 Vulius

See also 
 List of Roman gentes
 Roman naming conventions
 Praenomen
 List of Roman cognomina

References

Bibliography
 Gaius Julius Caesar, Commentarii de Bello Gallico (Commentaries on the Gallic War); De Bello Africo (On the African War, attributed).
 Marcus Terentius Varro, De Lingua Latina (On the Latin Language).
 Titus Livius (Livy), History of Rome.
 Publius Cornelius Tacitus, Annales.
 Theodor Mommsen et alii, Corpus Inscriptionum Latinarum (The Body of Latin Inscriptions, abbreviated CIL), Berlin-Brandenburgische Akademie der Wissenschaften (1853–present).
 Notizie degli Scavi di Antichità (News of Excavations from Antiquity, abbreviated NSA), Accademia dei Lincei (1876–present).
 Bulletin Archéologique du Comité des Travaux Historiques et Scientifiques (Archaeological Bulletin of the Committee on Historic and Scientific Works, abbreviated BCTH), Imprimerie Nationale, Paris (1885–1973).
 René Cagnat et alii, L'Année épigraphique (The Year in Epigraphy, abbreviated AE), Presses Universitaires de France (1888–present).
 Stéphane Gsell, Inscriptions Latines de L'Algérie (Latin Inscriptions from Algeria), Edouard Champion, Paris (1922–present).
 Hermann Finke, "Neue Inschriften", in Berichte der Römisch-Germanischen Kommission, vol. xvii, pp. 1–107, 198–231 (1927).
 Epigraphica, Rivista Italiana di Epigrafia (1939–present).
 Hispania Epigraphica (Epigraphy of Spain), Madrid (1989–present).
 The Roman Inscriptions of Britain (abbreviated RIB), Oxford, (1990–present).
 Giovanni Battista Brusin, Inscriptiones Aquileiae (Inscriptions of Aquileia), Udine (1991–1993).
 M. Khanoussi, L. Maurin, Mourir à Dougga: Receuil des inscriptions funéraires (Dying in Dougga: a Compendium of Funerary Inscriptions, abbreviated MAD), Bordeaux, Tunis (2002).
 Teramo e la valle del Tordino, Documenti dell'Abruzzo Teramano, Band 7, Part 1, Teramo (2006).
 Manfred Clauss, Anne Kolb, & Wolfgang A. Slaby, Epigraphik Datenbank Clauss/Slaby (abbreviated EDCS).

Names nomina